Kevin Russel Gutiérrez González (born 1 March 1995) is a Mexican professional footballer who plays as a defensive midfielder for Correcaminos UAT.

Career
In the 2015 Clausura season, he played his first match of the season against Tigres in the start of second half even scoring 8 minutes later. Gutiérrez was later included in the starting eleven against Morelia where they won 2–1.

Honours
Mexico U20
CONCACAF U-20 Championship: 2015

References

External links
 
 

1995 births
Living people
Association football defenders
Chiapas F.C. footballers
Querétaro F.C. footballers
Club Tijuana footballers
Dorados de Sinaloa footballers
FC Juárez footballers
Correcaminos UAT footballers
Liga MX players
Ascenso MX players
Footballers from Chiapas
Mexican footballers
People from Tuxtla Gutiérrez
Mexico under-20 international footballers
2015 CONCACAF U-20 Championship players